Bizeh (also Romanized as Bīzeh; also known as Bīzakh) is a village in Mazinan Rural District, Central District, Davarzan County, Razavi Khorasan Province, Iran. At the 2006 census, its population was 1,157, in 330 families.

References 

Populated places in Davarzan County